Frank Crawford (1870–1963) was an American college football coach and later a professor of law.

Frank Crawford may also refer to:

 Frank Crawford (Australian rules footballer) (1887–1943), Australian rules footballer
 Frank Fairbairn Crawford (1850–1900), British Army officer and first-class cricketer
 Vivian Crawford (1879–1922), English cricketer, known as "Frank" during his playing career